Renée Vissac is a former French racing cyclist. She won the French national road race title in 1960.

References

External links
 

Year of birth missing (living people)
Living people
French female cyclists
Sportspeople from Haute-Loire
Cyclists from Auvergne-Rhône-Alpes